Marc-Andrea Hüsler defeated Holger Rune in the final, 6–4, 7–6(10–8) to win the singles tennis title at the 2022 Sofia Open. It was his maiden ATP Tour title, and he saved two match points en route, in his quarterfinal match against Kamil Majchrzak. Hüsler became the fourth Swiss man, after Roger Federer, Stan Wawrinka and Marc Rosset, to win an ATP Tour title in the 21st century.

Jannik Sinner was the two-time defending champion, but retired from his semifinal match against Rune.

Seeds
The top four seeds received a bye into the second round.

Draw

Finals

Top half

Bottom half

Qualifying

Seeds

Qualifiers

Lucky loser

Qualifying draw

First qualifier

Second qualifier

Third qualifier

Fourth qualifier

References

External links
 Main draw
 Qualifying draw

2022 ATP Tour
2022 Singles